The Cumbria Way is a linear  long-distance footpath in Cumbria, England.
 The majority of the route is inside the boundaries of the Lake District National Park. Linking the two historic Cumbrian towns of Ulverston and Carlisle, it passes through the towns of Coniston and Keswick. The route cuts through Lakeland country via Coniston Water, Langdale, Borrowdale, Derwent Water, Skiddaw Forest and Caldbeck. It is a primarily low-level route with some high-level exposed sections.

History
The Cumbria Way was originally devised in the 1970s by local Ramblers Association members. The waymarking of the entire route was completed by volunteers and national park staff in May 2007.

Route
The route can be walked in either direction but is described here as south to north beginning at the trailhead of Ulverston and ending in Carlisle.

Stage 1: Ulverston to Coniston

The route leaves the urban area of Ulverston, birthplace of Stan Laurel, and heads north towards the village of Gawthwaite and the boundary of the Lake District National Park. The trail, which consists primarily of field paths at this stage, leads to the settlement of Sunny Bank and the shore of Coniston Water, the western shoreline of which is followed before reaching the settlement of Coniston. Grizedale Forest is visible to the east of the lake with Coniston Old Man and Dow Crag being visible to the west on approach to Coniston.

Stage 2: Coniston to Langdale

The route leaves Coniston heading in a NNW direction through woodland towards Tarn Hows. The way involves some road walking as it passes through the villages of Colwith and Skelwith Bridge. The Langdale Pikes soon become visible as the route leaves Skelwith Bridge in a NNE direction, passing Elter Water before entering the Great Langdale valley.

Stage 3: Langdale to Keswick

The route leaves Langdale and travels alongside Mickleden beck, with the mountain of Bow Fell to the west and Langdale Pikes to the east. After a significant gain in elevation the route crosses Stake Pass before descending via Langstrath beck and turning towards the villages of Stonethwaite and Rosthwaite. The route subsequently follows the River Derwent before reaching Derwent Water where it follows the shoreline path to reach the town of Keswick. The mountains Skiddaw and Blencathra may be visible to the north.

Stage 4: Keswick to Caldbeck

After some urban walking on the exit from Keswick, the route crosses the A591 road before ascending past Latrigg towards Skiddaw House Youth Hostel. After crossing the area of fells known as Back o'Skiddaw the route passes High Pike and the Caldbeck Fells before descending towards the village of Caldbeck.

Stage 5: Caldbeck to Carlisle

After leaving the village of Caldbeck this final low-level section of the route follows the course of the River Caldew to the city of Carlisle, Cumbria's county town. The route passes through the villages of Sebergham, Buckabank and Dalston primarily following woodland and farmland public footpaths and bridleways.

Geology and biology

Flora and fauna
The tarns encountered on the route provide a habitat for a wide range of species including vendace, charr, crayfish and schelly.

The red squirrel can be found in woodland encountered on the route.

The high precipitation in the ancient woodland encountered throughout the route provides a favourable habitat for mosses, liverworts, ferns and lichens. The boggy areas encountered, particularly on the high-level parts of the route, provide a habitat for carnivorous plants including sundew and butterwort.

Connecting trails 
The route connects with the Allerdale Ramble, Cumbria Coastal Way, Coast to Coast Walk, Hadrian's wall path, Cistercian Way, Eden Way and Windermere Way.

Further reading
The following Ordnance Survey maps cover the route:

Explorer 1:25k sheets OL4, OL5, OL6, OL7 and 315
Landranger 1:50k sheets 85, 90 and 97

Other maps available:
 Cumbria Way XT40 (Waterproof Route Map), Harvey Map Services . 

The following guidebooks detail the route:
 The Cumbria Way and the Allerdale Ramble, Jim Watson, Cicerone Press, 
 The Cumbria Way, Anthony Burton, . Aurum Press.
 The Cumbria Way, John Trevelyan, . Dalesman

References

External links

 Ramblers
 Long Distance Walkers Association
 The Cumbria Way Walk

Long-distance footpaths in England
Footpaths in Cumbria
County-themed walking routes in the United Kingdom